Mountaineer may refer to:

Sports
Mountain climber, the sport, hobby or profession of walking, hiking, trekking and climbing up mountains, also known as alpinism

University athletic teams and mascots
Appalachian State Mountaineers, the athletic teams of Appalachian State University
Eastern Oregon Mountaineers, the athletic teams of Eastern Oregon University
Mansfield Mountaineers, the athletic teams of Mansfield University of Pennsylvania
Mohawk Mountaineers, the athletic teams of Mohawk College
West Virginia Mountaineers, the athletic teams of West Virginia University; and their mascot, The Mountaineer
Western State Colorado Mountaineers, the athletic teams of Western State Colorado University

Other
Mercury Mountaineer, a midsize sport utility vehicle (SUV) manufactured under the Mercury brand
Mountaineers cricket team, a Zimbabwean first class cricket team.
Mountaineers women's cricket team, a Zimbabwean women's cricket team.
Mountaineer Power Plant, a major coal-fired electricity-generating station in New Haven, West Virginia, USA 
Mountaineers (American Civil War), a reference to either Union or Confederate fighters, as well as the military units they served in, to indicate that the fighters or units resided in, or fought in, mountainous regions during the American Civil War, especially the Appalachian and Blue Ridge mountains.
The Mountaineers (club) outdoor recreation club based in Seattle, WA 
Mountaineer (train), a passenger train operated by Amtrak in the 1970s
The Mountaineer, a newspaper based in Waynesville, North Carolina
The Mountaineer (Katoomba), an Australian newspaper in Katoomba, New South Wales (1894—1908)
Bearded mountaineer, Oreonympha nobilis, a species of hummingbird